Hilding Viktor Ekman (10 January 1893 – 7 March 1966) was a Swedish runner who competed at the 1920 Summer Olympics in the cross country events. He finished 11th individually and won a bronze medal with the Swedish team.

References

1893 births
1966 deaths
Swedish male long-distance runners
Olympic bronze medalists for Sweden
Athletes (track and field) at the 1920 Summer Olympics
Olympic athletes of Sweden
Medalists at the 1920 Summer Olympics
Olympic bronze medalists in athletics (track and field)
Olympic cross country runners
Athletes from Stockholm